Henry "Buddy" Francis Fountain Jr. (born 1924 - died 2011) was an architect in Biloxi, Mississippi. He and his firm were responsible for several public buildings in Biloxi and Ocean Springs, Mississippi.

Fountain was born in Biloxi on November 26, 1924 to Henry F. Fountain (born 1899 - ?) and Lucretia Ann Edmee Thensted (born 1901 - 1930?). His father and grandfather Martin Fountain (1856–1938) were boatbuilders.

Fountain served in the U.S. Navy during World War II. He married Gloria Swetman in June 1950 and graduated from LSU with a B.S. degree in Architectural Engineering in 1951. Francis established his career as a professional architect in 1955.

He and his wife Gloria Swetman Fountain had nine children in Ocean Springs. They lived in the Fountain-Guice home (1969) on Iola Road. The home won a design award from the Southern Pine Association. Fountain died on June 5, 2011.

Work
 Mississippi Coast Coliseum, Biloxi
 Our Lady of Fatima Catholic Church, Biloxi
 Biloxi High School (1961), Biloxi (A newer building was constructed for the school in 2002)
 Biloxi Public Safety Complex, Biloxi
 St. John's Catholic Church (1959), Ocean Springs 
 Pecan Park Elementary School (1967), Ocean Springs
 Ocean Springs Hospital (1968)
 Magnolia Park Elementary School (1969)
 Ocean Springs Hospital additions and alterations (1977)
 Ocean Springs High School Fine Arts Building
 Ocean Springs Hospital outpatient services addition (1989)
 Ocean Springs Hospital emergency room and ICU (1995)
 Ocean Springs Hospital third floor addition (1998)

References

Further reading
"H.F. 'Buddy' Fountain" June 7, 2011 The Sun Herald
"Architect left his stamp on the Coast" June 7, 2011 The Sun Herald

Architects from Mississippi
People from Biloxi, Mississippi
1924 births
2011 deaths
United States Navy personnel of World War II
Louisiana State University alumni